Emre Taşdemir (born 8 August 1995) is a Turkish professional footballer who plays as a left back for Galatasaray and the Turkey national team.

Club career

Ankaragücü
On 3 March 2013, Taşdemir made his league debut with MKE Ankaragücü against Bucaspor.

Bursaspor
In 2014, he joined Bursaspor. He made his debut for his new club on 29 October 2014 in a cup game against Tepecik B.S.

Galatasaray
On 9 January 2019, Emre joined Turkish club Galatasaray.

Kayserispor (loan)
On 23 January 2020, Galatasaray loaned Taşdemir, a defensive player, to Kayserispor until the end of the 2019–20 season.

Giresunspor (loan)
On 19 August 2021, Giresunspor added left-back player Taşdemir from Galatasaray on loan until the end of the season.

International career
On 8 June 2015, Taşdemir made his debut with the national team in an international friendly fixture against Bulgaria. He played the full game, which resulted in a 4–0 home win.

Honours
Galatasaray
 Süper Lig: 2018–19
 Turkish Cup: 2018–19
 Turkish Super Cup: 2019

Career statistics

Club

International

Personal life
Taşdemir is of Kurdish descent and married Merve İrem Cingil in July 2020.

References

External links
 
 
 
 
 

1995 births
Living people
People from Yenimahalle
Association football fullbacks
Footballers from Ankara
Turkish footballers
Turkey international footballers
Turkey under-21 international footballers
Turkey youth international footballers
Bursaspor footballers
Süper Lig players
MKE Ankaragücü footballers
Galatasaray S.K. footballers
Giresunspor footballers